Yanukism is a Ukrainian term for different linguistic blunders and mistakes that Ukrainian politicians make. The phenomenon is named after the previous president Viktor Yanukovych who was trying to put up a façade of a well-educated man but ended up embarrassing himself due to numerous mistakes.

One of the best known examples of a Yanukism is probably proffessor, which got started as Yanukovych misspelled the academic title in his registration form during the 2004 presidential election. In the same form, Yanukovych made in total 12 different mistakes: he misspelled the names of his wife and his hometown. In addition, Yanukovych has made so many other mistakes that his doctor's degree in economics has been called into question. Also, the fact that Yanukovych was among the best-selling authors of Ukraine in the early 2010s raised questions about the true author of his books due to all his past mistakes.

Examples on Yanukisms 

Yanukisms can also be manifested by factual mistakes instead of misspellings or other mistakes language-wise. Yanukovych has said among other things that Mount Athos is located in Palestine (actually in Greece), called the Winter Olympics 2022 'a World Championship' and said that Israel is a European country.

References 

Ukrainian language
2000s neologisms
Viktor Yanukovych